Luis Argentino Palau (September 11, 1896 – February 8, 1971) was an Argentine chess master.

He played for Argentina in three Chess Olympiads.
 In 1924 at 1st unofficial Chess Olympiad in Paris (+5 –4 =4);
 In 1927 at 1st Chess Olympiad in London (+7 –4 =4);
 In 1928 at 2nd Chess Olympiad in The Hague (+9 –5 =2).

In 1921/22, he tied for 10-12th in Montevideo (Roberto Grau won). In 1925, he won in Montevideo. In 1928, he took 2nd, behind Grau, in Mar del Plata (1st it). In 1934/35, he tied for 3rd-4th in Buenos Aires (Luis Piazzini won).

Palau was awarded the International Master (IM) title in 1965.

References

External links

1896 births
1971 deaths
Argentine chess players
Chess International Masters
Chess Olympiad competitors
Place of birth missing
20th-century chess players